Club Deportivo Injerto is a Spanish football team based in Berbinzana, in the autonomous community of Navarre. Founded in 1946, they play in Primera Autonómica – Group 1, holding home matches at Campo de Fútbol El Sotico, with a capacity of 1,000 people.

Season to season

References

External links
 
Soccerway team profile

Football clubs in Navarre
Association football clubs established in 1946
1946 establishments in Spain